The 2020–21 season was Sparta Rotterdam's 133rd season in existence and the club's second consecutive season in the top flight of Dutch football. In addition to the domestic league, Sparta Rotterdam participated in this season's edition of the KNVB Cup. The season covered the period from 1 July 2020 to 30 June 2021.

Players

First-team squad

Reserve squad

Players out on loan

Pre-season and friendlies

Competitions

Overview

Eredivisie

League table

Results summary

Results by round

Matches
The league fixtures were announced on 24 July 2020.

European competition play-offs

KNVB Cup

References

External links

Sparta Rotterdam seasons
Sparta Rotterdam